The Puffin Foundation, established in 1983, is a non-profit organization that aims to amplify the voices of minorities who may be underrepresented due to their race, gender, social philosophy, etc. The foundation achieves this mission of fostering free expression by providing grants and resources to local artists and art organizations.

Ultimately, the goal of the Puffin Foundation is to provide people with an understanding that every single person can go out and make change happen.

History 
The Puffin Foundation, with more than $14 million in assets split between two independent entities, was seeded with the fortune Perry Rosenstein made in the Allen screw business. He got into the fasteners industry as a salesman. As he made the rounds on his accounts, he found several buyers who wanted diversity in Allen screws. He saw an opening in the market and began making screws in Japan. As an outsider in the industry, he faced stiff competition in the business. That experience has partly informed his interests in providing grants to artists and thinkers who do not usually secure grant money from more traditional foundations. He says he wants to make the fight a fair one.

The Puffin Foundation Ltd. received its Certificate of Incorporation of The Foundation as defined in sub-paragraph (a)(5) of Section 402 of the Not-For-Profit Corporation Law and shall be a Type B corporation under Section 201 On January 17, 1983, by the State of New York Department of State. It then received its 501(c)(3) as is a private not-for-profit.  Dorothea Violet Rosenstein, née Cohn 7/4/24–6/6/81, was president and Founder Perry Rosenstein's wife who prior to her death joined  group of volunteers to work with  the  National Audubon's Dr. Stephen Kress to bring 10- to 14-day-old pufflings  from Great Island, Newfoundland to Eastern Egg Rock off the coast of Maine. When these young Puffins were ready to fledge, they were banded with the hope they would return in 2–3 years and start a new colony on this island which was once a flourishing colony until 1885 when hunters  took the last survivors. The restoration  idea was based on the fact that young puffins usually return to breed on the same island where they were hatched. This project was successful. The Puffin Foundation Ltd.'s name was chosen in 1983 in honor and in memoriam  of his  wife, Dorothea Violet Rosenstein. Unlike Captain Kirk's prime directive to never interfere, Puffin Foundation Ltd. was created with the idea that sometimes you have to  interfere to make things right.

Through his Teaneck, New Jersey-based foundation, Rosenstein states his mission as to fund "as many different areas of expression as possible." Largely, he funds progressive or liberal work. The Bronx-native says that he attended his first protest as a boy atop his father's shoulders.

"I happen to be one of many people that believes in our country and our democracy," said Rosenstein. "I feel that if democracy is threatened, we are all threatened."

Operations 

The foundation has two grant cycles per year. The first cycle, which occurs between the months of January and June, typically allocates grant of $1000 to $2500 to individual artists and arts organizations. The second cycle funds media and awards grants to publications that do investigative reporting on issues like labor, the environment, LGBTQ concerns, feminism and women's issues.

Over the years, the foundation has continued to broaden its scope. In 1997, the foundation began a project known as the Puffin Cultural Forum, which funds and hosts performances as well as art exhibits at 20 Puffin Way in Teaneck, NJ. For instance, the Puffin Foundation collaborates with The Nation Institute, on an annual human rights award, the Puffin/Nation Prize for Creative Citizenship, which is given to someone who has done distinctive and courageous social justice work. Thus far, the foundation has awarded this honor to Dolores Huerta of the United Farm Workers, Robert Moses of the Algebra Project, the founders of the Innocence Project, and Cecile Richards of Planned Parenthood. The foundation has also partnered with the organization VoteRiders to spread state-specific information on voter ID requirements.

The Puffin 
The Puffin, a species whose nesting sites were endangered by encroaching civilization, were encouraged to return to their native habitats through the constructive efforts of a concerned citizenry. The Foundation has adopted the name Puffin as a metaphor for how it perceives its mission, which is to ensure that the arts continue to grow and enrich our lives. In so doing it has joined with other concerned groups and individuals toward achieving that goal.

References

External links 
 

Arts awards in the United States
Arts foundations based in the United States
Arts organizations based in New Jersey
Teaneck, New Jersey
Music organizations based in the United States
Theatrical organizations in the United States
Human rights organizations based in the United States
Social justice organizations
Non-profit organizations based in the United States